Juan Alonso Pérez de Guzmán may refer to:
Juan Alfonso Pérez de Guzmán, 3rd Duke of Medina Sidonia (1464–1507)
Juan Alonso Pérez de Guzmán y Coronel (1285–1351), 2nd lord of Sanlúcar